Mieza may refer to :

 Mieza, Macedonia, a former village in ancient Macedonia, where Aristotle taught the young Alexander the Great
 Mieza, Spain, a municipality in the province of Salamanca, Spain
 Mieza nervosa, a moth of the family Notodontidae
 Mieza, the daughter of Beres in Greek mythology